Uniontown is an unincorporated community in Fairfax County, in the U.S. state of Virginia.

References

Unincorporated communities in Virginia
Unincorporated communities in Fairfax County, Virginia
Washington metropolitan area